Bhai Nihang Khan (Gurmukhi: ਨਿਹੰਗ ਖ਼ਾਨ, Shahmukhi: نهنگ خاں) was the zamindar ruler of a small principality called Kotla Nihang Khan near Ropar in Punjab, India. He was a friend and follower of the tenth Sikh Guru, Guru Gobind Singh. The Guru and his associates frequently stayed with Nihang Khan, who often sheltered and provided succor to them in the period when they were facing persecution by Mughal forces. By way of faith and ethnicity, Nihang Khan was a Muslim Pathan.

Guru Gobind Singh and Nihang Khan first met on the Amavas of the month of Maghar in Vikram Samvat year 1745 (corresponding to 1688 CE). Nihang Khan was so impressed that he declared that he would "dedicate his all in the cause of the Guru." To honor him, Sikh religious literature often refers to him as Bhai Nihang Khan. One of Nihang Khan's sons was Bhai Alam Khan, whose wedding the Guru also attended on May 3, 1694.

See also
Guru Gobind Singh
Kotla Nihang Khan

References

Mughal Empire
History of Sikhism
Medieval India
Indian Sikhs